Halomonas alimentaria is a bacterium first isolated from jeotgal, a traditional Korean fermented seafood, hence its name. It is Gram-negative, moderately halophilic, non-motile and coccus- or short rod-shaped, with type strain YKJ-16T (= KCCM 41042T = JCM 10888T).

References

Further reading

External links

LPSN
Type strain of Halomonas alimentaria at BacDive -  the Bacterial Diversity Metadatabase

Oceanospirillales
Bacteria described in 2002